Shimcha Finkelstein (1917-1987), was a male Polish and Israeli international table tennis player.

Table tennis career
He won a bronze medal at the 1936 World Table Tennis Championships in the Swaythling Cup (men's team event) with Alojzy Ehrlich and Samuel Schieff for Poland.

He was Polish team champion for Hasmonea Warsaw and singles champion in 1937. He was of Jewish origin and before the war switched allegiance to Israel and won the first ever Israeli championship beating Mordecai Finberg in the final.

Personal life
He left Poland in May 1937 via Romania to Palestine. He retired in 1967, had three children and died in 1987.

See also
 List of table tennis players
 List of World Table Tennis Championships medalists

References

Polish male table tennis players
Israeli table tennis players
1917 births
1987 deaths
Jewish table tennis players
World Table Tennis Championships medalists
Sportspeople from Warsaw
Polish emigrants to Mandatory Palestine
Israeli people of Polish-Jewish descent